Venedy is a village and a township in Washington County, Illinois, in the United States:

 Venedy, Illinois
 Venedy Township, Illinois